The Yellow Balloon is a 1953 British drama film directed by J. Lee Thompson and starring Andrew Ray, William Sylvester, Kathleen Ryan, Kenneth More and Hy Hazell. It was Thompson's second feature as director. It was distributed by Associated British and produced by the company's Marble Arch Productions. It was made at Elstree Studios with sets designed by the art director Robert Jones. Location shooting took place around Bayswater and Chelsea.

Plot
The film is set in the immediate aftermath of the Second World War, in London's East End, amongst the bomb sites.

12-year-old Frankie Palmer (Andrew Ray) loses the sixpence his father has given him to buy a large yellow balloon from a street seller which the boy has set his heart on. He sees that a friend of his, young Ronnie Williams (Stephen Fenemore), has already bought one and Frankie snatches it off him and runs off with it, with Ronnie in hot pursuit.

Ronnie chases Frankie into a large, bombed-out house and they are running about in the ruins when Ronnie slips and falls  to his death. Frankie scrambles down to help, but realises that there is nothing he can do. Hiding in the shadows and seeing it all, Len Turner (William Sylvester), a criminal on the run and using the ruins as a hideout from the police, convinces Frankie that the police will arrest the boy and charge him with the murder of his friend for pushing him to his death and that they must both make their getaway.

Although Frankie and Len agree it was an accident, Len is adamant that the police will not see it that way and Frankie goes off with him. Len blackmails Frankie into stealing money from his parents (Kenneth More and Kathleen Ryan) to help fund Len's escape and then uses the boy as a decoy in a pub robbery that goes horribly wrong when Len murders the pub owner.

Realising that Frankie is the only witness to his crime, Len knows he must kill the boy, too. This develops into a terrifying hide-and-seek chase through a bomb-damaged, abandoned and highly-perilous London Underground station, with Len hot on the heels of Frankie, who is desperately trying to escape with his life.

A tube driver passing at speed through the station sees the pursuit as he speeds past the platform. He reports it at the next station and the police are alerted. They rescue Frankie. In a poetic-justice ending Len walks over a beam over a long drop before falling to his death.

Cast
 Andrew Ray as Frankie Palmer 
 Kathleen Ryan as Emily Palmer 
 Kenneth More as Ted Palmer 
 Bernard Lee as PC Chapman 
 Stephen Fenemore as Ron Williams
 William Sylvester as Len
 Marjorie Rhodes as Jessie Stokes 
 Peter Jones as Sid
 Eliot Makeham as Pawnbroker 
 Sid James as Barrow Boy
 Veronica Hurst as Sunday School Teacher 
 Sandra Dorne as Iris
 Campbell Singer as Potter  
 Laurie Main as Bibulous Customer  
 Hy Hazell as Mary
 Edward Evans as 	PC Patterson
 Richard O'Sullivan as Boy Singing at Sunday School
 Brenda de Banzie as Fruit Stall Customer
 Hilda Barry as 	Newspaper Seller
 Hugh Moxey as	Police Officer
 Peggy Ann Clifford as 	Cafe Owner

Production
The film was based on an idea of Anne Burnaby. She originally wanted the character of Mary to be a prostitute but was not allowed for censorship reasons. Star Andrew Ray had just appeared in The Mudlark. William Sylvester was an American who settled in Britain after the war.

Filming had definitely begun by May, 1952, as there is an on set photograph available of Andrew Ray celebrating his 13th birthday on May 31 of that year at Elstree Studios blowing out the candles on his birthday cake, surrounded by his parents and other children from the film. The film was shot at Elstree Studios and on location around London.

Censorship
The Yellow Balloon was one of the first films to be passed with the then new Adults Only "X" certificate by the British Board of Film Censors, which barred anyone under the age of 16 years from being allowed into a cinema to see the film. This was because the censor felt that the chase through the London Underground station in the last reel would be very frightening for young children. Andrew Ray, 13 years old when the film was shot in 1952 and when it was released in 1953, was disappointed that he wasn't allowed to go into a cinema to see his own film because he was under the age of 16.

However, after complaints from cinema exhibitors that the "X" certificate wasn't really necessary for the film and it was losing them the family audience they had relied on up until that time, the BBFC eventually relented and in October 1953 they re-classified the film with an "A" certificate (children under 16 allowed in to see the film if accompanied by an adult).

Reception

The Observer called it "a forceful and far from stupid British film which we might have appreciated more had we not seen The Window." Variety said it "should chalk up modest grosses."

In The New York Times, critic Bosley Crowther wrote: "it is a leisurely sort of chiller that trades intriguingly upon a youngster's far-fetched fears...The moral is, of course, that children should speak up rather than harbor their fears. But they don't. So probably the British will be able to go right on making these variably fascinating films for years."

References

External links

The Yellow Balloon at Letterbox DVD
The Yellow Balloon at TCMDB

1953 films
1953 drama films
Films about children
Films directed by J. Lee Thompson
Films set on the London Underground
Films shot at Associated British Studios
Films shot in London
Allied Artists films
British drama films
British black-and-white films
Films with screenplays by J. Lee Thompson
1950s English-language films
1950s British films